Pierre-Alexandre Busson (born 3 June 1977), better known as Yuksek, is a French electronic music producer, remixer, singer and DJ from Reims. Yüksek means "high" in Turkish.

Biography
Yuksek was born in Reims, France. Yuksek played the piano at the Conservatoire of Music until the age of 17 – the time he decided to give up his studies. After playing the piano for ten years at a conservatoire, he took part in several bands such as Klanguage, whose first album was released in 2007.

He created his first tracks as Yuksek in 2002 and then started to perform successfully as a DJ all over the world. At the same time, his first EPs and remixes were released on labels such as Relish, I'm a Cliché, Kitsuné, Exploited and Citizen.

His debut album, Away from the Sea, was released on 9 February 2009. Featuring the singles Tonight and Extraball, this album received a lot of media attention, including an interview on the popular French TV talk show Le Grand Journal on premium pay television channel Canal+. Tonight was also selected as the soundtrack for the show in January 2009. His track Extraball was featured in a commercial for the Airness "Attraction" deodorant, as well as Lacoste Red ! collection in 2009. His track Tonight has also been chosen for the Peugeot commercial "Alchemy", part of a major brand revival, that was broadcast on French TV from January 2010.

Yuksek has also been involved in many other musical projects such as The Krays (with Brodinski) and Peter & The Magician (with Stephen Fasano, ex-Aeroplane).

After touring for 2 years, Yuksek released his second album, Living on the Edge of Time, on 13 June 2011. This album – like the debut single "On a Train" – took a pop direction while retaining Yuksek's electronic flow.

In December 2011, Yuksek played the renowned New Year Rhythm and Vines festival in Gisborne, New Zealand, then headed to the Field Day music festival in Sydney, Australia on New Year's Day 2012.

In April 2013, Yuksek launched his own label, Partyfine. The first EP, EP#1 was released on 13 May 2013. It includes featurings with Juveniles and Oh Land. The second one, with Peter & The Magician, was released on 24 June 2013 and is titled On My Brain.

Collaborations

The Krays
Yuksek is a longtime friend of Brodinski, a French DJ who also comes from Reims. The Krays is the musical collaboration between Yuksek and French producer Brodinski. Their first EP titled We’re Ready When You Are was released on 17 May 2010. (Abracada).

Peter & The Magician
Since 2011, Yuksek has been collaborating with The Magician (aka Stephane Fassano, former member of Aeroplane) under the stage name Peter & The Magician. Their first song "Twist" has been recorded on a Kitsuné compilation (Kitsuné Maison Compilation 11: "The Indie Dance Issue") released on 26 May 2011.

The three-track EP also called Twist was released one month later on the Kitsuné label.

The Alexanders 
The Alexanders is a collaboration between Yuksek and English DJ and producer Alex Metric. The Alexanders released their debut single "Don't Miss" through Yuksek's label Partyfine on 24 February 2014. The song features vocals from Anna Lunoe. The duo remixed Porter Robinson's "Lionhearted" (featuring Urban Cone), the third single from his debut studio album Worlds. The remix features on the extended play as well as the limited edition album box set.

Discography

Albums

Extended plays

Singles

Collaborations

Remixes

Music videos
Video clips have been produced for the following tracks : "Tonight", "Extraball", "Sunrise", "On A Train", "Always On The Run", "Off The Wall", "Do Beijo", "Gorgeous", "Into The Light" and "G.F.Y.".

Production
He produced “Manual for Successful Rioting” - Birdy Nam Nam’s second album - (except track 11 produced by Justice).

References

1977 births
Electronic dance music DJs
Fiction Records artists
French DJs
French electronic musicians
French house musicians
Living people
Nu-disco musicians
Musicians from Reims
Remixers